The 2021–22 Liiga season was the 47th season of the Liiga (formerly SM-liiga), the top level of ice hockey in Finland, since the league's formation in 1975.

Teams

Regular season

Standings
Top six advanced straight to the quarter-finals, while teams between 7th and 10th positions played a wild card round for the final two spots. The Liiga is a closed series and thus there is no relegation. The top 3 teams of the regular season qualified for the Champions Hockey League and the 4th team to the Spengler Cup.

The match program was on hiatus during the EHT, Karjala Cup from 7 to 14 November. In December, Christmas was a week-long match break. 
In December, a new ice rink named Tampere Deck Arena (Nokia Arena) was opened in Tampere for the use of Ilves and Tappara. Two matches were played in the new arena on February 19, when Ilves hosts his own in the afternoon and Tappara in the evening.

Statistics

Scoring leaders

The following shows the top ten players who led the league in points, at the conclusion of the regular season. If two or more skaters are tied (i.e. same number of points, goals and played games), all of the tied skaters are shown.

Leading goaltenders
The following shows the top ten goaltenders who led the league in goals against average, provided that they have played at least 40% of their team's minutes, at the conclusion of games played on 25 September 2021.

Playoffs
Contrary to the best of three format used in the past seasons, the wild-card round will take place in best of two format, with overtime only played after the second game if the points are tied. The remaining rounds will be played in the best-of-7 format.

Bracket

Wild-card round
The wild-card round series will be decided as a two game series. Compared to normal playoffs format both games can also end on a tie. If after two games both teams have one win or both games have ended on a tie, immediately after the second game an additional game will play played, which will determine the team that will go through to next round. The additional game will be played as five against five game and with 20 minutes periods. Sudden death rule applies. Penalties received during the 2nd game, which have not ended when 2nd game ends, will be cancelled. Only exception is game misconducts, which will carry on to the additional game.

Quarter-finals

Semifinals

Bronze medal game

Finals

Tappara wins the finals 4-1.

Final rankings

References

External links 
Official site 
Liiga on eurohockey.com

Liiga seasons
Liiga
Liiga